Albert Henry Severinsen (November 9, 1944 – January 27, 2015) was a Major League Baseball pitcher who played in  with the Baltimore Orioles and in  and  with the San Diego Padres. He batted and threw right-handed. Severinsen had a 3–7 record, with a 3.08 ERA, in 88 games, in his three-year career. He was signed by the Chicago Cubs as an amateur free agent in 1963. He attended Wagner College. He was traded along with Enzo Hernández, Tom Phoebus and Fred Beene from the defending World Series Champion Orioles to the Padres for Pat Dobson and Tom Dukes on December 1, 1970. He was assigned to the Tidewater Tides after being dealt to the New York Mets for Dave Marshall exactly two years later on December 1, 1972. 

Severinsen died January 27, 2015, at his home in Mystic, Connecticut.

References

External links

1944 births
2015 deaths
Major League Baseball pitchers
Baseball players from New York (state)
Baltimore Orioles players
San Diego Padres players
Hawaii Islanders players
Wagner Seahawks baseball players
People from Mystic, Connecticut